Ryan Mitchell may refer to:
 Ryan Mitchell (swimmer)
 Ryan Mitchell (wrestler)
 Ryan Mitchell (Power Rangers)